

Group A

Albania
Albania's 17-man squad to play in the 2016 Kazakhstan President Cup.

Coach:  Džemal Mustedanagić

Cruzeiro-Kazakhstan

Coach:  Gustavo Quintana Ribeiro

Kazakhstan
Kazakhstan 17 man squad to play in the 2016 Kazakhstan President Cup.

Coach: Aleksandr Kuznetsov

Kyrgyzstan
Kyrgyzstan 16 man squad to play in the 2016 Kazakhstan President Cup.

Coach: Samat Suymaliev

Group B

Azerbaijan
Azerbaijan's 17-man squad to play in the 2016 Kazakhstan President Cup.

Coach:  Tabriz Hasanov

Azerbaijan-Cruzeiro
AC's 3-man squad to play in the 2016 Kazakhstan Cup.

Coach:  Vusal Mustafayev

Iran
Iran's 16-man squad to play in the 2016 Kazakhstan President Cup.

Coach:  Abas Chamanian

Russia-2
Russia's 17-man squad to play in the 2016 Kazakhstan President Cup.

Coach:  David Khmelidze

RFU has declared that it didn't send any national teams to this tournament. Under the guise of the national team on a tournament one of teams of Krasnodar Krai participated. Officially the structure of the national team on a tournament hasn't been announced.

Tajikistan
Tajikistan 16 man squad to play in the 2016 Kazakhstan President Cup.

Coach:  Zayniddin Rahimov

References 

Kazakhstan President Cup (football)